2002 in Ghana details events of note that happened in Ghana in the year 2002.

Incumbents
 President: John Kufuor
 Vice President: Aliu Mahama
 Chief Justice: Edward Kwame Wiredu

Events

January
 Annual New Year school held in University of Ghana, Legon, Accra.

February

March
6 March - 45th independence anniversary
March - District Assembly elections held.

April

May
1st - Workers' Day celebrations held.

June

July
1st - Republic Day

August

September

October
31st - President John Kufuor makes an eight-day official visit to China.

November

December
National Best Farmer Celebrations held

National holidays
Holidays in italics are "special days", while those in regular type are "regular holidays".
 January 1: New Year's Day
 March 6: Independence Day
 May 1: Labor Day
 December 25: Christmas
 December 26: Boxing day

In addition, several other places observe local holidays, such as the foundation of their town. These are also "special days."

References

 
Years of the 21st century in Ghana
2000s in Ghana
Ghana
Ghana